The 2014 IAAF Diamond League was the fifth edition of the annual Diamond League. It consisted of fourteen one-day track and field meetings, starting on May 9, 2014 in Doha, Qatar and ending on September 5, 2014 in Brussels, Belgium. Other events were held in Shanghai, Eugene, Oslo, Rome, New York City, Lausanne, Paris, Fontvieille, Stockholm, Birmingham and Zürich. Glasgow, Great Britain hosted the event for the first time on July 11 & 12, 2014 at Hampden Park.

Justin Gatlin, LaShawn Merritt, Renaud Lavillenie, Eunice Jepkoech Sum, Dawn Harper-Nelson, Caterine Ibargüen, Valerie Adams and Sandra Perković all defended their titles from the 2013 IAAF Diamond League while Alonso Edward, Nijel Amos, Caleb Mwangangi Ndiku, Pascal Martinot-Lagarde, Michael Tinsley, Jairus Kipchoge Birech, Godfrey Khotso Mokoena, Mutaz Essa Barshim, Thomas Röhler, Veronica Campbell-Brown, Novlene Williams-Mills, Jennifer Simpson, Mercy Cherono, Hiwot Ayalew, Tianna Bartoletta and Mariya Kuchina all won overall titles for the first time in their careers. All overall race winners received $40,000 in prize money.

The United States recorded the most overall wins with nine of their athletes claiming victories, their most successful season since the start of the Diamond League in 2010, with Kenya, France and Jamaica also having multiple athletes who claimed overall race victories. Other successful nations included Panama, Botswana, South Africa, Qatar, Poland, Germany, Ethiopia, Colombia, Russia, Brazil, New Zealand, Croatia and the Czech Republic. Having taken overall titles in the 2013 season, Great Britain, Estonia, Puerto Rico, Ukraine, Djibouti and Sweden did not have any athletes winning titles, although all except Estonia recorded individual race wins throughout the 2014 season.

Meetings
The fourteen meetings for the 2014 IAAF Diamond League:

Events

There were 16 men's and 16 women's disciplines in the Diamond League and seven events per discipline in the season. Each event had a prize money of US$30,000, with a winner's share of $10,000. The season winner of each discipline won US$40,000.

Results
Events not included in the Diamond League are marked in grey background.

Men

Track

Field

Women

Track

 In Birmingham, a 2 miles race was counted to the Diamond League standings for the 5000 metres.
 In Doha, New York, Lausanne and Brussels, 3000 metres races were counted to the Diamond League standings for the 5000 metres.

Field

References

Results
Doha Results. Diamond League. Retrieved on 2014-07-05.
Shanghai Results. Diamond League. Retrieved on 2014-07-05.
Eugene Results. Diamond League. Retrieved on 2014-07-05.
Rome Results. Diamond League. Retrieved on 2014-07-05.
Oslo Results. Diamond League. Retrieved on 2014-07-05.
New York Results. Diamond League. Retrieved on 2014-07-05.
Lausanne Results. Diamond League. Retrieved on 2014-07-05.

External links

Official website

Diamond League
Diamond League